Joe "Bean" Esposito (born May 5, 1948) is an American singer/songwriter whose career spans from the 1970s to the present day. Esposito's songs have been recorded by Donna Summer, Aretha Franklin, Patti LaBelle, Stephen Stills and others.

Biography
Esposito was a member of the band Brooklyn Dreams, best known for their collaboration with Donna Summer on the US top ten hit "Heaven Knows". Esposito collaborated with producer Giorgio Moroder on the 1982 Solitary Men project, which became Esposito's first solo album.

In 1983, Esposito contributed the song "Lady, Lady, Lady" to the Flashdance soundtrack album; the song also appeared on the Solitary Men album. In 1984, his song "You're the Best" was included in The Karate Kid film and soundtrack.

In 1984, the Flashdance soundtrack was nominated for Album of the Year at the Grammys; the soundtrack album contained one of Esposito's songs ("Lady, Lady, Lady") as well as songs from various other acts. In 1988, Brenda Russell and Esposito were nominated for Best Pop Duo for the song "Piano in the Dark", as he supplied vocals on the song as well. Also in 1988, he duetted with Laura Branigan on the song "Come into My Life" which appeared on the soundtrack to the film Coming to America.

Personal life
Joe Esposito was born in New York City in Brooklyn. He is the father of Mike Esposito, who pitched in 2005 for Major League Baseball's Colorado Rockies. He is also the father of Joey Esposito, Nicole Esposito, and Shauna Esposito.  He is married to Lynda Esposito.

Discography

1983:  Solitary Men - Giorgio Moroder and Joe Esposito, produced by Giorgio Moroder, Oasis Records
1987:  Joe, Bruce and Second Ave - produced by Michael Omartian, EMI America
1996: Treated and Released - produced by Joe Esposito, Pool Party Records

Soundtrack appearances
American Hot Wax (1978) Kenny Vance on lead vocals with Brooklyn Dreams performing as The Planotones on backup
Foxes (1980) Lyrics: "Shake It" performed by the Brooklyn Dreams
Zapped! (1982) performer: "Updikes Theme" - Joe "Bean" Esposito
Flashdance (1983) performer: "Lady, Lady, Lady" - Joe "Bean" Esposito
Staying Alive (1983) Lyrics: "Hope We Never Change", "Moody Girl", "I'm Never Gonna Give You Up", "The Winning End"
The Karate Kid (1984) performer: "You're the Best" -  Joe "Bean" Esposito
Lovelines (1984) performer: "A Time Like This Again" - Joe "Bean " Esposito
Thief of Hearts (1984) performer: "Just Imagine (Way Beyond Fear) - Joe "Bean" Esposito
3:15 - The Moment of Truth (1986) performer: "Out of Control" - Bob Conti and Joe "Bean" Esposito 
Coming to America (1988) performer "Come into My Life" - Laura Branigan and Joe Esposito
Butterbrot (1990) performer: "Take Me Home" - Joe Esposito
Freak City (1999) performer: "Two Bad Boys" - Joe Esposito

Other appearances
 1981: I'm a Rainbow - Donna Summer, performing "I Believe in You"
 1988: Get Here - Brenda Russell, performing "Piano in the Dark"

Current work
Esposito lives in Las Vegas where he performs as a vocalist at various casino hotels. During the early 1990s, he and Eddy Hokenson (of Brooklyn Dreams) toured with Kenny Vance and the Planotones, a vocal group created for the film American Hot Wax.  In May 2013, Esposito became the lead singer for the Brooklyn Bridge band, formerly known as Johnny Maestro & the Brooklyn Bridge.

See also
 Brooklyn Dreams
 Donna Summer
 Bruce Sudano
 Alive N Kickin'
 The Mystics
 Laura Branigan

References

External links
 https://eastcoastmusichalloffame.org/nominees/joe-esposito/
[ Joe Esposito] at AllMusic

1948 births
American male singers
American male songwriters
American soft rock musicians
American soul musicians
American people of Italian descent
Singers from New York City
Living people